John Clifton Alden (December 15, 1942 – June 6, 1990) was a Republican member of the Pennsylvania House of Representatives. He was born in Darby, Pennsylvania.

In May 1982, one of Alden's three daughters, 14-year-old Denise, was found fatally shot in his law office, later ruled a suicide. Her death was ultimately ruled accidental. He did not seek re-election to the House that year, and was succeeded by fellow Republican Bob Flick. Alden moved to San Diego, California. where he began many small businesses. He never returned to public service prior to his death from colon cancer. He was survived by two daughters: Jennifer (1973) and Jaclyn (1979–2009).

References

Republican Party members of the Pennsylvania House of Representatives
1990 deaths
1942 births
20th-century American politicians